Lionel Lorenzo Dietrichsen (1806–1846) was an English ornithologist who operated as a merchant at Oxford Street. He collected bird skins and described the species Parvipsitta porphyrocephala, which is known as Dietrichsen's lory, in 1832. He died, unmarried, reportedly by nearly severing his own head.

References

1806 births
1846 deaths
English ornithologists
Suicides by sharp instrument in England
1840s suicides